Lipophrys trigloides is a species of combtooth blenny. Distributed in the Eastern Atlantic along the coasts of France (Brittany), the Iberian Peninsula, Morocco, the Mediterranean and the Sea of Marmara southwards to Senegal, the Canary Islands and Madeira. Marine subtropical demersal fish, up to 13 cm length.

References

trigloides
Fish described in 1836
Fish of Europe
Fish of Africa
Fish of Western Asia
Fish of the Atlantic Ocean
Fish of the Adriatic Sea
Fish of the Mediterranean Sea